Turczyn may refer to the following places:
Turczyn, Gmina Choroszcz (eastern Poland)
Turczyn, Grajewo County (north eastern Poland)

See also